Edward 'Eddie' Ferns (born 18 April 1991) is a Scottish footballer who plays as a winger for Cumbernauld United.

Career
Ferns began his footballing career at Drumchapel Amateur, and signed with Alloa Athletic on 14 September 2012. He made his senior debut a day later, in a 0–2 home loss against Stenhousemuir, and was a part of the side who achieved promotion to the Scottish Championship in his first season. He made his Championship debut on 24 August 2013, scoring the last of a 3–1 home win over Cowdenbeath. On 25 February 2015, Ferns moved to Scottish League Two side, Albion Rovers on loan. At the end of the 2015–16 season, Ferns chose to leave Alloa in favour of signing for rivals Stirling Albion. Ferns left Stirling in January 2017, signing for fellow Scottish League Two side Arbroath shortly after.

Career statistics

Honours
Arbroath
 Scottish League Two : 2016-17

References

External links

1991 births
Living people
Scottish footballers
Association football wingers
Drumchapel Amateur F.C. players
Alloa Athletic F.C. players
Albion Rovers F.C. players
Stirling Albion F.C. players
Arbroath F.C. players
Scottish Football League players
Scottish Professional Football League players